Fleming and Ferguson was a Scottish marine engineering and shipbuilding company that traded between 1877 and 1969.

History

1877–1914
William Y. Fleming and Peter Ferguson (1840–1911) founded the company in Paisley, Scotland in 1877, making marine steam engines. In 1885 they expanded into shipbuilding by taking over the business and Phoenix Shipyard of H. McIntyre & Co., which had built  for Campbell of Kilmun. Fleming and Ferguson became a private company in 1895 and a public limited company in 1898. In 1903 the Ferguson family withdrew from the business and set up their own shipyard, Ferguson Shipbuilders, at Port Glasgow. However, Fleming and Ferguson survived their departure and developed a World-class reputation for reciprocating engines and small ships.

In 1889 Fleming and Ferguson built the cargo ship  with quadruple-expansion engines. By 1894 Fleming and Ferguson were also making water-tube boilers, which were featured in an article in The Engineer. The firm also built reciprocating engines for non-marine use. In 1904 it supplied two inverted triple-expansion engines for a water company in Brighton.

In the 1890s the company entered the specialist market for "knock down" vessels. These were bolted together at the shipyard, all the parts marked with numbers, disassembled into many hundreds of parts and transported in kit form for final reassembly with rivets. This elaborate method of construction was used to provide inland vessels for export. In 1898 it built the stern wheel paddle steamer  and exported it in sections for reassembly at Maryborough, Queensland in Australia.

The firms main specialisms were vessels such as dredgers, barges, tugboats, floating cranes, lighthouse tenders and, in 1904, the icebreaker . Occasionally it also built steam yachts. In peacetime it also took one Admiralty order, the minelayer  built in 1901 for service in New Zealand. In 1914 it had a workforce of 1,000.

First World War

Second World War

1945–69
In 1946 Fleming and Ferguson built the East African Railways and Harbours Corporation stern wheel paddle steamer , which plied the Albert Nile in Uganda. In 1964 the American Marine and Machinery Co. Inc. bought Fleming and Ferguson.

The company's final ship was a dredger that it built speculatively. Fleming and Ferguson ceased trading before completing the vessel so Hugh Maclean of Renfrew completed her. The dredger, yard number 804, was eventually named Bled and exported to Yugoslavia.

Surviving ships
Surviving Fleming and Ferguson products include the floating steam cranes Hikitia and Rapaki (both 1926) and dredger  (1929), all in New Zealand; dredger  (1961) (now called UCO 1 and registered in Bahrain) and research vessel Andusandhani (1963) on the Hooghly River in West Bengal.

References

Defunct shipbuilding companies of Scotland
Marine engine manufacturers
Companies based in Paisley, Renfrewshire
Engine manufacturers of the United Kingdom